Iran–Turkey relations are the bilateral relations between the Islamic Republic of Iran and the Republic of Turkey. The two states' relationship is complex and characterized by periods of both tension and cooperation, as both Iran and Turkey are fighting for influence in the Middle East through supporting opposing proxies as part of a proxy conflict. The two countries are also major trade partners and are perceived as mutually interdependent due to geographical proximity (Iran–Turkey border) as well as historically shared cultural, linguistic, and ethnic traits. Notably, the Kurds, an Iranic ethnic group, and the Iranian Azerbaijanis, a Turkic language  group, comprise the second-largest ethnicities of Turkey and Iran, respectively.  

Historically, the region has shared empires and conquests by the Parthians, Achaemenids, Sassanids, Seljuks, Safavids, Afsharids, Ottomans, and Qajars. As a Persianate society, the Ottomans in particular were very heavily influenced by Persian culture. This legacy has persisted in modern Turkish culture. Iran and Turkey have long been at odds over conflicts such as those in Syria, Libya, and the South Caucasus. However, they also have shared common interests in some instances, such as the issue of Kurdish separatism and the Qatar diplomatic crisis. 

Turkey has an embassy in Tehran and consulates in Mashhad, Tabriz and Urmia, while Iran has an embassy in Ankara and consulates in Istanbul, Erzurum and Trabzon.

History

Numerous times throughout the millennia-long history shared by the two neighboring nations, parts of the territory of Anatolia (or Asia Minor) were conquered by the various empires based in modern-day Iran, including the Median Empire, the Achaemenid Empire, the Parthian Empire, the Sassanian Empire, the Safavid Empire, and the Afsharid Empire, amongst others. In ancient times, the Asia Minor formed one of the core regions of the Achaemenid Empire, with the cities of Sardis and Smyrna in western Anatolia being the most notable. Iğdır Province, in what is now Eastern Anatolia, formed part of Qajar Iran up to the outcome of the Russo-Persian War (1826-1828) and the ratified Treaty of Turkmenchay.

Various empires based in what is now Turkey made inroads into what is now Iran, such as the Byzantine Empire, and the Ottoman Empire.

Iran's second major ethnic group is the Azerbaijanis, a Turkic people; there are also other Turkic peoples in Iran such as Turkmens and Qashqai people. Turks and Iranians share a common cultural heritage, known as the Turko-Persian tradition, which was a prominent characteristic of the Ghaznavid (977–1186), Seljuk (1037–1194), Sultanate of Rum (1077–1307), Ottoman (1299–1923), Timurid (1370–1507), Kara Koyunlu (1374–1468), Ak Koyunlu (1378–1501), and Safavid (1501–1736) Empires.

20th century
On 22 April 1926, the First "Treaty of Friendship" between Iran and Turkey was signed in Tehran. The basic principles included friendship, neutrality and non-aggression towards each other. The agreement also included possible joint action against groups who would try to disturb peace and security or who would try to overthrow either country's government. This policy was indirectly aimed at the internal problems both countries had with their Kurdish minorities.

On 23 January 1932, the first definitive frontier treaty between Turkey and Iran was signed in Tehran. The border between Turkey and Iran is one of the oldest in the world and has stayed more or less the same since the Battle of Chaldiran in 1514, and the Treaty of Zuhab. The 1932 treaty thus formalized a centuries-old status quo. On the same day, the countries signed a new Treaty of Friendship, as well as a Treaty of Conciliation, Judicial Settlement and Arbitration.

Between 16 June and 2 July 1934, Reza Shah Pahlavi visited Turkey with several high-ranking officials, including General Hasan Arfa (at the invitation of Mustafa Kemal Atatürk). Several regions in Turkey were visited and attempts at close friendship and cooperation between the two leaders were made. Reza Shah was reportedly impressed by the republic's modernization reforms and he saw this as an example for his own country.

On 8 July 1937, a non-aggression pact was signed between Turkey, Iran, Iraq and Afghanistan, which later became known as the Treaty of Saadabad. The purpose of this agreement was to ensure security and peace in the Middle East.

In August 1955, the Central Treaty Organization (CENTO), a mutual security pact between Iran, Turkey, Iraq, Pakistan and Britain was established.

In July 1964, the Regional Cooperation for Development (RCD), aimed at joint economic projects between Iran, Turkey and Pakistan, was established.

A period of coldness passed after the 1979 Iranian Revolution which caused major changes in Iran and the Middle Eastern status quo. Today, Iran and Turkey closely cooperate in a wide variety of fields, such as fighting terrorism, drug trafficking, and promoting stability in Iraq and Central Asia. However, the two countries have competed for influence since the 1990s; this has been escalating since the 2010s in various fronts across MENA and South Asia.

Iranian Nuclear Program
In May 2010, Turkish Prime Minister Recep Tayyip Erdogan made an unscheduled trip to Tehran in coordination with Brazilian President Lula da Silva to make an agreement to outsource Iranian uranium enrichment to his country to avoid further sanctions on Iran.

The decision of Turkey to host a radar system to track missiles launched from Iran has been seen by the Iranians as a serious break in relations.

In a 2012 Pew Research Global Attitudes Survey, 54% of Turks oppose Iran's acquisition of nuclear weapons, 46% consider a nuclear-armed Iran somewhat of a threat and 26% support the use of military force to prevent Iran from developing nuclear weapons. 37% of Turks believe that Iran is a minor threat/no threat at all, the lowest percentage between surveyed countries in MENA region (even lower than Jordan at 55%). But only 34% of Turkey's population approves of tougher sanctions on Iran, compared to 52% of Turks disapproving of sanctions.

NATO missile shield crisis

Turkey, the largest NATO member in the region, hosted the establishment of a NATO missile shield in September 2011 which has caused a crisis between Turkey and Iran. Iran claimed that the missile shield is a US plot to protect Israel from any counter-attack should Israel target Iran's nuclear facilities. In addition, Ayatollah Ali Khamenei stated that Turkey should rethink its policies over Syria, the missile shield, and promotion of secularism over the Arab world following the Arab Spring.

Iranian Major General Yahya Rahim Safavi also expressed his opinion over the situation: "the behaviour of Turkish statesmen towards Syria and Iran is wrong and, I believe, they are acting in line with the goals of America," adding that "if Turkey does not distance itself from this unconventional political behaviour it will have both the Turkish people turning away from it domestically and the neighbouring countries of Syria, Iraq and Iran reassessing their political ties."

Turkey stated that the NATO missile system neither causes a threat or targets any particular nation. Turkish Minister of National Defense, İsmet Yılmaz, insisted that the system's aim is to secure Europe, as well as for the security of Turkey.

On October 23, 2011, US Secretary of State Hillary Clinton warned Iran over the United States' presence in Turkey, saying that "Iran would be badly miscalculating if they did not look at the entire region and all of our presence in many countries, both in bases and in training with NATO allies, like Turkey.”

In November 2011, the head of the Revolutionary Guard's aerospace division threatened to strike Turkey if other countries attacked Iran.

Relations of Turkey and Iran with Israel
In the past, Turkey's ties with Israel have caused various disagreements between Ankara and Tehran. However, Turkey's neutral stance with regards to the disputes between Israel and Iran has secured the maintenance of friendly bilateral relations. The growing trade between Turkey and Iran indicates the two countries’ willingness to strengthen mutual ties.

Turkey's relations with Israel have deteriorated since the Gaza War (2008–09), the Gaza flotilla raid (2010) and the 2014 Israel–Gaza conflict. From 2010 to 2016, Turkey had no diplomatic relations with Israel at the ambassadorial level. However, on 28 June 2016, Turkey and Israel signed an agreement to normalize relations, which included a $20 million compensation fund from Israel to Turkish families affected by the Gaza-bound flotilla attack, an eventual return of ambassadors and initial talks of a natural gas pipeline.

Since the Arab Spring and Syrian Civil War
Iran's relations with Turkey have occasionally soured over the Turkish AKP government's active involvement in regional disputes between Shia and Sunni groups since the dawn of the Arab Spring. Iran firmly backs the Syrian government of Bashar al-Assad (formed mostly of Alawites), while the AKP government in Turkey (which has its roots in political Islam) supports the Syrian opposition (formed mostly of Sunni Muslims).

Both Turkey and Iran supported the Egyptian revolution of 2011 and the subsequent Mohamed Morsi government, and condemned the 2013 Egyptian coup d'état.

During the 2015 military intervention in Yemen, Iran and Turkey supported rival groups (Shia and Sunni, respectively), which led to official arguments between Recep Tayyip Erdoğan and Mohammad Javad Zarif. Erdoğan stated that "Iran and the terrorist groups must withdraw" and Zarif replied, "Turkey makes strategic mistakes". However, a few days later, Erdoğan went to Tehran for talks on improving Turkish-Iranian trade relations and was received by Khamenei and Rouhani.

Before the ascent of the Islamist AKP government to power in 2002, Turkey (a constitutionally secular state) had maintained a neutral foreign policy with regards to the religious and sectarian conflicts in the region.

Turkey and Iran's differing geopolitical goals in Syria and Iraq have also led to increased tension and suspicion. Turkey has on multiple occasions clashed with Iranian-backed Shiite militias such as Hezbollah and Ashab al-Kahf.

Anti-Iranian views have been propagated by Turkish media like Yeni Akit and Yeni Şafak due to the Iranian role during the Battle of Aleppo (2012–16).

Other matters also aggravate relations, such as both countries supporting opposing sides in Yemeni Civil War (2015–present), and Turkey's installation of a NATO radar tracking Iranian activities (Mahmoud Ahmadinejad said that the NATO defense system deployed in southeast Turkey was meant to protect Israel from Iranian missile attacks).

Reconciliation

Iran was quick to condemn the 2016 Turkish coup d'état attempt, leading to improved relations between the two countries.

From January 2017 onward, Turkey has collaborated closely with Iran and Russia in the Astana talks to resolve the Syrian Civil War.

Turkey's relations with Iran further improved during the 2017 Qatar diplomatic crisis, where both countries backed Qatar in a dispute with Saudi Arabia and the United Arab Emirates.

Turkey condemned the 2017–18 Iranian protests, accusing the United States and Israel of interference in internal Iranian affairs.

Iran and Turkey also backed one another in their respective disputes with the United States in summer 2018, with Turkey publicly opposing U.S. sanctions on Iran after U.S. withdrawal from the Iran nuclear deal, and Iran condemning U.S. sanctions on Turkey over the detention of Andrew Brunson. Both Turkey and Iran say they want to put a stop to the conflict even though both countries are supporting opposing sides in the Syrian war.

In February 2019, Turkey refused an invitation by the United States to attend a summit in Warsaw on countering Iranian influence in the Middle East, on the grounds that it "targets one country".

In January 2020, Turkey condemned the assassination of Qasem Soleimani by the United States, claiming it would lead to instability in the region. Erdogan later denied media reports that he had described Soleimani as a "martyr" in a phone conversation with President Rouhani.

Setback
The reconciliation suffered a massive setback when Turkey launched a military offensive against Rojava and the Syrian government. Iran, which is on good term with Turkey since the coup, began to criticize and condemn Turkey for invading Syria and violating Syrian territorial rights. Iranian foreign minister Mohammad Javad Zarif has voiced opposition to the offensive, viewing it as a violation of Syria's sovereignty. In addition, Iran's parliamentary speaker Ali Larijani canceled his scheduled trip to Turkey. Iran and Turkey’s lack of trust for each other has hampered them from achieving their various economic and political goals.

According to Ahval News, an analyst wrote that while the two countries are competing for influence in Central Asia, particularly in Muslim republics, it is hindering them from becoming real allies.

Relations declined further after the Syrian Army shelled the Turkish Army in Idlib, as Syria is backed by Iran and the Iranian Army's presence in northern Syria.

Up and down
In 2020, following the Israel–United Arab Emirates peace agreement that normalised Israel–United Arab Emirates relations, Iran and Turkey were among the most vocal critics against the peace treaty.

Iran has been thought to have a multifaceted role in the Second Libyan conflict. Israel has accused Iran of providing armament support to anti-Turkish warlord Khalifa Haftar in Libya. However, Iran later publicly expressed support for the Turkish military intervention in the Second Libyan Civil War. A United Nations report nonetheless revealed that Iran had supplied Haftar's forces with anti-tank missiles.

Iran has strongly denied reports that Iranian trucks were involved in transferring Russian armaments to Armenia during the 2020 Nagorno-Karabakh conflict, and offered to mediate between Armenia and Turkish ally Azerbaijan. Iran also reaffirmed its support for Azerbaijan's "territorial integrity". However, Iran has been critical of Turkey's role in the clashes, calling on Turkey to support peace initiatives rather than adding "fuel to the fire". Iran also warned of the presence of "terrorists" near its border, referring to the Syrian jihadists which Turkey and Azerbaijan have been accused of using in Nagorno-Karabakh. In addition, Iran arrested several pro-Azerbaijan protesters in northern and northwestern Iranian cities, including some Turkish citizens. Relations between Azerbaijan and Iran have been historically uneasy, mainly due to Iran's fear of Pan-Turkist sentiments promoted by Azerbaijani leaders like Abulfaz Elchibey, as well as Azerbaijan's close relations with Iran's greatest regional adversary, Israel. On the other hand, relations between Armenia and Iran have remained close because of their strong economic ties and Armenia's military alliance with Iranian ally and Turkish rival Russia.

Relations between Turkey and Iran worsened after Turkish President Recep Tayyip Erdogan recited a poem claiming the lands of Iranian Azerbaijan as the territory of the Republic of Azerbaijan, sparking backlash from Iran, fearing the rise of Pan-Turkism among its Iranian Azeri population. Iranian Foreign Minister Mohammad Javad Zarif stated: "President Erdogan was not informed that what he ill-recited in Baku refers to the forcible separation of areas north of Aras from Iranian motherland. Didn't he realize that he was undermining the sovereignty of the Republic of Azerbaijan? No one can talk about our beloved Azerbaijan." Iran also summoned the Turkish ambassador for explanation. On December 12, Turkey summoned the Iranian ambassador to Ankara considering Tehran’s “aggressive” reaction to Erdogan’s poem. Turkey's foreign minister Mevlut Cavusoglu said to Zarif on a phone call that Iran’s public statements against the Turkish leader were unacceptable and "baseless". Iran initiated a boycott of Turkish goods as a result of Erdogan’s comments.

On 15 February 2021, an Iranian-backed proxy group, Ashab al-Kahf, carried out a missile attack on a Turkish military base in Iraq as retaliation for a Turkish offensive against the Kurdistan Workers' Party (PKK), which is classified as a terrorist group by the US and EU, in northern Iraq. Additionally, Harakat Hezbollah al-Nujaba, another Iranian proxy, issued a warning that it would attack Turkey if it did not end its operations in Iraq. The attack was perceived as a warning from Iran to Turkey against the latter's operations against the PKK. Turkish state-owned media claimed that the attack reflected Iran's support for the group. On 23 February, Iran's ambassador to Baghdad, Iraj Masjedi, mentioned that "Turkish forces should not pose a threat or violate Iraqi soil", and criticized Turkish intentions to control Sinjar. On 27 February, Turkey's ambassador to Iraq, Fatih Yıldız, tweeted that "Ambassador of Iran would be the last person to lecture Turkey about respecting borders of Iraq".

Collaboration against terrorism
Turkey and Iran vowed to collaborate in their fight against terrorists in Iraq, as thousands of Turkish troops pressed ahead with an air and ground offensive against the militants in northern Iraq. Iranian Foreign Minister Ali Akbar Salehi claimed that the deaths of Turkish soldiers might have been avoided if the United States had informed Turkey that the terrorists were infiltrating into Turkey with heavy weaponry. The U.S. shares intelligence from surveillance drones with Turkey about movement of the PKK along the border.

The Turkish government shut down a probe, revealing connections between the Iranian Revolutionary Guard and the highest levels of the Turkish government.

According to NBC News, a member of the Turkish parliament said that the 2011 Syrian uprising led Turkey to agree that they need Iran and Russia in order to stop a Kurdish state from forming on its southern border.

Trade relations

Iran and Turkey have very close trade and economic relations. Both countries are part of the Economic Cooperation Organization (ECO).

Bilateral trade between the nations is increasing. Between 2000 and 2005, this trade increased from $1 billion to $4 billion. Iran’s gas export to Turkey is also likely to be increased. At present, the rate is at 50mm cm/d. Turkey imports about 10 billion cubic meters a year of gas from Iran, about 30 percent of its needs. Turkey plans to invest $12 billion in developing phases 22, 23 and 24 of South Pars gas field, according to a senior Iranian oil official Two-way trade is now in the range of $10 billion (2010), and both governments have announced that the figure should reach the $20 billion mark in the not too distant future. 50 percent of the gas from three phases of Iran’s South Pars gas field will be re-exported to Europe. Turkey has won the tender for privatization of the Razi Petrochemical Complex, valued at $650 million (2008).

Iranian First Vice President Mohammad-Reza Rahimi announced in October 2012 that the speed of trade exchanges between Iran and Turkey has accelerated and was close to reaching the goal of $30 billion per year. He added that the growing trade relations between Tehran and Ankara indicate the two countries’ willingness to strengthen mutual ties. On April 29, 2019, Turkey and Iran highlighted their intentions of increasing cooperation in the aspect of transportation according to Hurriyet daily news.

Turkey stopped buying Iranian oil completely in 2019 to comply with US sanctions.

On 17 December 2020, the Iranian Customs Administration announced the re-opening of the Bazargan border crossing in the northwest of Iran, which had shut down 3 months earlier due to the COVID-19 crisis. Iranian and Turkish trucks were again allowed to pass due to a significant decline of COVID cases in both countries. The closure of borders between the two countries caused a 70% decline in trade, which is now predicted to increase sharply.

Tourism
Iran and Turkey have extensive tourism relations for years. In 2017 a total of 2.5 million Iranian tourists visited Turkey, making the country as the favorite destination for holiday travelers. In turn Iran also benefits from Turkish tourism. As of 2013, tourists from Turkey comprise one of the largest that visit Iran, comprising 391,283 registered tourists.

Embassies 
The Embassy of Iran is located in Ankara, Turkey. The Embassy of Turkey is located in Tehran, Iran.

Islamic Republic of Iran
Ankara (Embassy)
Istanbul (Consulate-General)
Erzurum (Consulate-General)
Trabzon (Consulate-General) 

Republic of Turkey
Tehran (Embassy)
Mashhad (Consulate-General)
Tabriz (Consulate-General)
Urmia (Consulate-General)

See also
 Azerbaijan–Iran relations
 Central Treaty Organization
 Foreign relations of Iran
 Foreign relations of Turkey
 Ottoman-Persian Wars

References

External links
 
 

 
Iran
Turkey